Basadre may refer to:

Estadio Jorge Basadre, multi-purpose stadium in Tacna, Peru
Genebert Basadre (1984–2021), amateur boxer from the Philippines
Jorge Basadre (1903–1980), Peruvian historian and writer
Jorge Basadre Grohmann National University, public university in Tacna, Peru
Jorge Basadre Province, one of four provinces in the Tacna Region of Peru

See also
Basdei
Basscadet